Mountpleasant railway station (alternatively Mount Pleasant) was a railway station in County Louth, Ireland on the Belfast - Dublin Railway line. The station closed in 1965.

The now demolished station was located in the Mountpleasant area of County Louth, north of Dundalk and close to Aghnaskeagh, Ravensdale, Currathir Bridge and  Ballymakellelt. Although the station once comprised a Station House, Signal House, and platform, the disused structures were destroyed in the 1970s as a result of law-enforcement officials considering that they had been used to support Irish Republicans in the Northern Ireland Troubles.

First known as Plaster railway station, the station was unusual in having only one platform and sat between Dundalk railway station, to the south, and Adavoyle railway station (which closed in 1933), to the north. At the time of closure, it was the nearest railway station to the Northern Ireland frontier, just 2.6km (1½ miles) away.

Routes

References

Disused railway stations in County Louth
Railway stations opened in 1852
1852 establishments in Ireland
Railway stations closed in 1965
1965 disestablishments in Ireland

Railway stations in the Republic of Ireland opened in 1852